Le gang des gaffeurs, written and drawn by Franquin, is the thirteenth album of the original Gaston Lagaffe series. It is composed of 46 strips previously published in Spirou. It was published in 1974 by Dupuis.

Story

Inventions
divan : highly comfortable divan, full of late readers' letters
giant shoe :shoe made for a shoes seller
a giant aquarium: a network of pipes in which water flows
scented aerosol: a revolutionary substance through which the light can not go
machine to play cup-and-ball: device badly adjusted, so that it can hit the user
gas generator: engine fed with fuel, but too much polluting
miniature plane: this plane perfectly works, but the radio control turns out to control a Russian satellite

Background
This is the last album before Franquin's breakdown. Next publications will become rarer.

References

 Gaston Lagaffe classic series on the official website
 Publication in Spirou on bdoubliées.com.

External links
Official website 

1974 graphic novels
Comics by André Franquin